Meng Jie may refer to:

 Meng Jie (fencer), a Chinese fencer.
 Meng Jie, a fictional character in the historical novel Romance of the Three Kingdoms. See List of fictional people of the Three Kingdoms#Chapter 89.